Isaac Annan may refer to:
 Isaac Annan (footballer, born 1992)
 Isaac Annan (footballer, born 2001)